Architectura: Zeitschrift für Geschichte der Baukunst is a biannual peer-reviewed academic journal of the history of architecture published by Deutscher Kunstverlag. The journal was established in 1971 and is abstracted and indexed in the Arts and Humanities Citation Index, Art Abstracts, Art Index, and Current Contents/Arts & Humanities. Articles are in German or English. The editors-in-chief are Dorothée Sack and Johannes Cramer (Technical University of Berlin).

References

External links 
  
 

Architecture journals
Publications established in 1971
Multilingual journals
German-language journals
English-language journals
Biannual journals
Architectural history journals